Plenette Michelle Pierson (born August 31, 1981) is a retired American professional basketball player who last played for the Minnesota Lynx of the Women's National Basketball Association (WNBA). In the 2007 season, Pierson won the first ever Sixth Woman of the Year Award given in the WNBA. Pierson is currently an assistant coach at Texas Tech.

College
Pierson played college basketball for the Texas Tech Red Raiders women's basketball team. She graduated in 2003.

Texas Tech statistics

Source

Professional career

WNBA

Pierson was drafted fourth overall by the Phoenix Mercury in 2003 WNBA Draft. Midway through the 2005 season, Pierson was traded to the Detroit Shock. In the 2006 season, the Shock were a championship contender as they finished second in the Eastern Conference with a 23–11 record. They would advance all the way to the finals and defeat the Sacramento Monarchs in five games. The following season, Pierson would win the first ever WNBA Sixth Woman of the Year Award given by the league for her scoring and rebounding efforts off the bench, averaging 11.9 points per game and 5.8 rebounds per game. Coinciding with her efforts, the Shock were in the hunt to win back-to-back championships with the number one seed in the eastern conference and another trip to the Finals, but were defeated by the Phoenix Mercury in five-game series. The following season, the Shock made it to the Finals for the third year in a row, this time winning their second championship in three years, after sweeping the San Antonio Silver Stars in the Finals. However, the following season, Pierson would only play one game and missed the rest of the season due to a shoulder injury.

In 2010, the Detroit Shock franchise relocated to Tulsa, Oklahoma and were renamed the Tulsa Shock. In the 2010 season, Pierson would play 8 games for the Shock before being traded to the New York Liberty where she played for the rest of the season. In the 2011 season, Pierson averaged a career-high in scoring with 12.9 points per game in the Liberty's starting lineup. She would continue to play with Liberty until 2014.

In 2015, Pierson returned to the Tulsa Shock in free agency. She played 30 games with 29 starts, averaged 12.8 points per game and was voted as an all-star for the first time in her career. In 2016, the Shock relocated to Dallas, Texas and were renamed the Dallas Wings. She played and started in 27 games and averaged 11.9 points per game.

On February 1, 2017, Pierson signed with the Minnesota Lynx in free agency. On August 18, 2017, Pierson announced that she would retire at the end of the season. During the season, Pierson would contribute off the bench for the Lynx, averaging 5.2 points per game. The Lynx finished with the best record in the league with a 27–7 record, earning the number 1 seed and a double-bye to the WNBA semi-finals. The Lynx would eliminate the Washington Mystics in a 3-game sweep of the WNBA semi-finals and would advance to the 2017 WNBA Finals, making it Pierson's fourth career Finals appearance. The Lynx would defeat the Los Angeles Sparks in 5 games to avenge last season's Finals loss, as Pierson won her third WNBA championship.

Overseas
In the 2005-06 WNBA off-season, Pierson played in Italy for Coconuda Maddaloni. In the 2006-07 WNBA off-season, Pierson played in Israel for Elitzur Ramla. In the 2007-08 WNBA off-season, Pierson played in Russia for Dynamo Moscow. In the 2011-12 WNBA off-season, Pierson played in Israel for Maccabi Bnot Ashdod. From 2012 to 2014, Pierson played two off-seasons in Slovakia for Good Angels Košice. In the 2014-15 WNBA off-season, Pierson played in Italy for Passalacqua Ragusa. In August 2016, Pierson signed with the Cheongju KB Stars of the Korean League for the 2016-17 WNBA off-season.

Coaching

Lynx
On March 14, 2019, The Minnesota Lynx announced the hiring of Pierson as an assistant coach.

Texas Tech
On June 6, 2022, Pierson was announced as an assistant coach at her alma mater, Texas Tech. She'd leave her post as an assistant with the Lynx and would join the team immediately.

WNBA career statistics

Regular season

|-
| style="text-align:left;"| 2003
| style="text-align:left;"| Phoenix
| 33 || 5 || 18.2 || .379 || .000 || .634 || 2.4 || 0.7 || 0.5 || 0.3 || 1.2 || 6.0
|-
| style="text-align:left;"| 2004
| style="text-align:left;"| Phoenix
| 31 || 25 || 25.9 || .443 || .000 || .606 || 4.2 || 0.8 || 0.8 || 0.5 || 1.5 || 9.4
|-
| style="text-align:left;"| 2005*
| style="text-align:left;"| Phoenix
| 12 || 11 || 26.5 || .343 || .000 || .690 || 4.9 || 1.1 || 0.8 || 1.0 || 2.6 || 7.7
|-
| style="text-align:left;"| 2005*
| style="text-align:left;"| Detroit
| 17 || 15 || 19.3 || .494 || 1.000 || .476 || 5.5 || 0.5 || 0.5 || 0.2 || 1.8 || 7.7
|- 
| style="text-align:left;"|  2005
| style="text-align:left;"|  Total
| 23 || 0 || 19.3 || .437 || .500 || .698 || 2.7 || 0.9 || 0.6 || 0.2 || 1.8 || 7.7
|- 
|style="text-align:left;background:#afe6ba;"|  2006†
| style="text-align:left;"| Detroit
| 34 || 0 || 16.6 || .456 || .000 || .700 || 3.9 || 0.7 || 0.5 || 0.4 || 1.0 || 6.5
|-
| style="text-align:left;"| 2007
| style="text-align:left;"| Detroit
| 34 || 0 || 25.2 || .478 || .000 || .754 || 5.8 || 1.7 || 0.7 || 0.8 || 2.3 || 11.6
|-
|style="text-align:left;background:#afe6ba;"|  2008†
| style="text-align:left;"| Detroit
| 28 || 0 || 23.2 || .457 || .000 || .752 || 4.9 || 2.3 || 0.8 || 1.2 || 1.7 || 11.9
|-
| style="text-align:left;"| 2009
| style="text-align:left;"| Detroit
| 1 || 0 || 5.0 || .000 || .000 || .000 || 0.0 || 1.1 || 1.0 || 1.0 || 0.0 || 0.0
|-
| style="text-align:left;"| 2010*
| style="text-align:left;"| Detroit
| 8 || 1 || 15.8 || .535 || .429 || .857  || 2.5 || 1.3 || 1.2 || 0.3 || 1.6 || 12.1
|-
| style="text-align:left;"| 2010*
| style="text-align:left;"| New York
| 25|| 0 || 16.7 || .458 || .250 || .817 || 3.8 || 1.1 || 0.6 || 0.3 || 1.8 || 9.0
|-
| style="text-align:left;"|  2010
| style="text-align:left;"|  Total
| 33 || 1 || 16.5 || .479 || .364 || .827 || 3.5 || 1.2 || 0.8 || 0.3 || 1.8 || 9.7
|- 
| style="text-align:left;"| 2011
| style="text-align:left;"| New York
| 33 || 33 || 28.6 || .478 || .200 || .806 || 5.2 || 1.4 || 1.1 || 0.9 || 1.8 || 12.9
|-
| style="text-align:left;"| 2012
| style="text-align:left;"| New York
| 26 || 24 || 24.7 || .466 || . 278 || .759 || 5.4 || 2.3 || 0.7 || 0.8 || 2.3 || 12.0
|-
| style="text-align:left;"| 2013
| style="text-align:left;"| New York
| 32 || 27 || 27.6 || .401 || .000 || .720 || 5.8 || 2.5 || 0.5 || 0.6 || 2.4 || 11.6
|-
| style="text-align:left;"| 2014
| style="text-align:left;"| New York
| 33 || 8 || 17.4 || .455 || .000 || .859 || 3.1 || 1.2 || 0.4 || 0.1 || 1.3 || 7.2
|-
| style="text-align:left;"| 2015
| style="text-align:left;"| Tulsa
| 30 || 29 || 28.1 || .437 || .362 || .808 || 4.1 || 1.9 || 0.9 || 0.4 || 1.8 || 12.8
|-
| style="text-align:left;"| 2016
| style="text-align:left;"| Dallas
| 27 || 27 || 26.6 || .387 || .337 || .829 || 4.6 || 2.0 || 0.8 || 0.3 || 1.7 || 11.9
|-
|style="text-align:left;background:#afe6ba;"|  2017†
| style="text-align:left;"| Minnesota
| 34 || 4 || 13.7 || .427 || .339 || .792 || 2.2 || 1.5 || 0.4 || 0.1 || 1.0 || 5.2
|-
| style="text-align:left;"| Career
| style="text-align:left;"| 15 years, 4 teams
| 444 || 194 || 22.2 || .439 || .302 || .744 || 4.1 || 1.5 || 0.7 || 0.5 || 1.7 || 9.6

Postseason

|-
| style="text-align:left;"| 2005
| style="text-align:left;"| Detroit
| 2 || 0 || 10.0 || .400 || .000 || .000 || 3.0 || 0.0 || 0.5 || 0.0 || 0.0 || 2.0
|-
|style="text-align:left;background:#afe6ba;"| 2006†
| style="text-align:left;"| Detroit
| 10 || 0 || 18.9 || .426 || .000 || .706 || 5.4 || 1.7 || 0.6 || 0.9 || 1.4 || 8.8
|-
| style="text-align:left;"| 2007
| style="text-align:left;"| Detroit
| 11 || 1 || 25.5 || .422 || .500 || .732 || 7.2 || 1.6 || 0.6 || 1.0 || 2.5 || 11.2
|-
|style="text-align:left;background:#afe6ba;"| 2008†
| style="text-align:left;"| Detroit
| 6 || 0 || 17.8 || .474 || .000 || .846 || 3.0 || 1.7 || 0.6 || 0.3 || 1.8 || 7.8
|-
| style="text-align:left;"| 2010
| style="text-align:left;"| New York
| 5 || 3 || 20.0 || .523 || .333 || .625 || 2.4 || 1.2 || 0.0 || 0.2 || 2.0 || 10.4
|-
| style="text-align:left;"| 2011
| style="text-align:left;"| New York
| 3 || 3 || 29.0 || .577 || .000 || .500 || 4.0 || 2.7 || 1.3 || 1.6 || 2.6 || 10.7
|-
| style="text-align:left;"| 2012
| style="text-align:left;"| New York
| 2 || 2 || 30.5 || .389 || .000 || .800 || 5.0 || 3.0 || 0.5 || 0.0 || 1.5 || 9.0
|-
| style="text-align:left;"| 2015
| style="text-align:left;"| Tulsa
| 2 || 2 || 26.8 || .357 || .333 || .000 || 5.5 || 0.5 || 1.0 || 0.5 || 0.5 || 10.5
|-
|style="text-align:left;background:#afe6ba;"| 2017†
| style="text-align:left;"| Minnesota
| 8 || 0 || 5.4 || .364 || .500 || .000 || 0.8 || 0.5 || 0.1 || 0.1 || 0.6 || 1.1
|-
| style="text-align:left;"| Career
| style="text-align:left;"|9 years, 4 teams
| 49 || 11 || 19.2 || .444 || .364 || .698 || 4.2 || 1.4 || 0.5 || 0.6 || 1.6 || 8.0

Personal life
Pierson was born in Houston, Texas and grew up in nearby Kingwood, Texas. She is the daughter of Paulette Pierson and has a younger brother, Cleven and another brother Vontriel. She attended Kingwood High School, from which she graduated in 1999.

References

1981 births
Living people
All-American college women's basketball players
American women's basketball coaches
American women's basketball players
Basketball coaches from Texas
Basketball players from Houston
Centers (basketball)
Dallas Wings players
Detroit Shock players
Minnesota Lynx players
Minnesota Lynx coaches
New York Liberty players
People from Kingwood, Texas
Phoenix Mercury draft picks
Phoenix Mercury players
Power forwards (basketball)
Sportspeople from Houston
Texas Tech Lady Raiders basketball players
Tulsa Shock players
Women's National Basketball Association All-Stars